Renew Europe is a political group in the European Committee of the Regions, bringing together liberal and democrat city mayors, regional presidents and ministers, and local and regional councillors to contribute to the European Union's legislative procedure. The group is the successor to the Alliance of Liberals and Democrats for Europe in the European Committee of the Regions (ALDE-CoR) which existed from 2005 to 2019, which in turn succeeded the ELDR-CoR group which had existed since 1998. The group consists of members from several European political parties, including Alliance of Liberals and Democrats for Europe and the European Democratic Party. The Renew Europe group in the European Committee of the Regions is the sister group of the Renew Europe political group in the European Parliament.

History 
In 1998 political groups were established in the European Committee of the Regions, and as a result the liberal and democrat members formed the group of the European Liberal Democrat and Reform Party (European Parliament group). In 2005 the group was renamed to the Alliance of Liberals and Democrats for Europe Party (ALDE) reflecting a similar change in the group in the European Parliament and incorporating new members along with the change. In 2019 the group was renamed to Renew Europe following the change in the group in the European Parliament.

In 2016, Bart Somers, Mayor of Mechelen and leader of the liberal group in the Flemish Parliament, was elected as new Renew Europe (former ALDE-CoR) President by the group. He served as president until the end of the European Committee of the Regions mandate (2020). In 2020 February, François Decoster was elected new President of Renew Europe CoR. Decoster, currently Mayor of Saint-Omer, France, and since August 2019 head of cabinet of the French State Secretary for Diplomacy, Trade, Tourism & Development, is no stranger to the European Committee of the Regions and European politics.

The list of Renew Europe presidents:

Renew Europe Bureau 
The Renew Europe Bureau consists of the Presidency, Chairs, Vice-Chairs of CoR Commissions belonging to the Renew Europe Group as well as four elected members. The Bureau is primarily tasked with preparation of meetings of the CoR Bureau as well as the subsequent Renew Europe meetings. The Bureau meets the day before each plenary session of the CoR.

The list of Renew Europe bureau:

References

External links 
Renew Europe Group in the European Committee of the Regions (official website)
 European Committee of the Regions (official website)
 ALDE Party

Alliance of Liberals and Democrats for Europe Party member parties
European Committee of the Regions party groups